Magic Forest: The Anthology is a compilation album by English folk rock band Fat Mattress, released on 13 June 2006 by Sanctuary Records and Castle Communications. It includes both of their albums plus bonus tracks.  The album is named after "Magic Forest", a song from the band's self-titled debut album released as a single in 1969.

Track listing

Tracks 1 to 10 are Fat Mattress album (1969)

Tracks 1 to 11 are Fat Mattress II album (1970)

References

Fat Mattress albums
2006 compilation albums
Albums produced by Noel Redding
Albums produced by Neil Landon
Castle Communications compilation albums
Sanctuary Records compilation albums